Benjamin Christian Lund (born 12 March 1997) is a Danish footballer who plays as a left-back for Denmark Series club Holbæk B&I.

Youth career
Lund started playing football when he was 3 years old. He was born in Rønne, Bornholm. He started playing in a little club named Knudsker IF, and later in Rønne IK. Lund later moved to FC Nordsjælland.

Club career

FC Nordsjælland
Lund signed a professional contract with FCN on 6 July 2016, and was promoted to the first team squad at the age of 19.

He got his FC Nordsjælland debut on 14 August 2016. Lund played the whole match in a 1–3 defeat against OB in the Danish Superliga. Lund's contract expired in the summer 2017, and he didn't get it extended due to the limited playing time. He began training with Viborg FF and Vendsyssel FF after he left FC Nordsjælland.

Vendsyssel FF
On 13 July 2017 it was announced, that Lund had signed with Vendsyssel FF.

Lund was loaned out to Thisted FC in the Danish 1st Division on 14 January 2019 due to the lack of playing time at Vendsyssel FF. Lund played the first three games of 2019, before he was diagnosed with mononucleosis. He said to the medias, that he would be out for an unknown period of time.

On transfer deadline day, 2 September 2019, Lund was loaned out again, this time to Danish 2nd Division club B.93 for the 2019/20 season. Vendsyssel then confirmed on 12 August 2020, that Lund had left the club.

Later career
After his loan spell at the club, it was confirmed on 28 August 2020, that he would continue at the club on a permanent basis.

On 7 June 2021, FC Roskilde confirmed the signing of Lund. After a year in Roskilde, Lund moved to Denmark Series club Holbæk B&I.

References

External links
 
 Benjamin Lund at DBU

1997 births
Living people
Danish men's footballers
Danish Superliga players
Danish 1st Division players
FC Nordsjælland players
Vendsyssel FF players
Thisted FC players
Boldklubben af 1893 players
FC Roskilde players
Holbæk B&I players
Denmark youth international footballers
Association football defenders
People from Bornholm
Sportspeople from the Capital Region of Denmark